Kim Jae-hong (born 10 August 1984) is a South Korean former footballer.

Career statistics

Club

Notes

References

1984 births
Living people
South Korean footballers
Association football midfielders
Daegu FC players
Geylang International FC players
Singapore Premier League players
South Korean expatriate sportspeople in Singapore
Expatriate footballers in Singapore